Emmy (born Emma Bejanyan; 12 April 1984) is an Armenian singer. She is considered one of Armenia's most popular and influential singers, being labelled as a "pop princess" and "Armenian pop icon". Emmy represented Armenia in the Eurovision Song Contest 2011 and became the country's first non-qualifier.

Early career
Emmy's career took off immediately after she recorded her first song, "Hayastan," and released its video, in 1993. She earned numerous awards at song competitions in Armenia, Russia, Turkey, Europe, and elsewhere. She sang and toured with the all-female folk-pop quartet Hayer from 1994 to 2000.

Other projects
Emmy also runs Emmy-B Production Center, a music-production company searching for new young talents in Armenia.

As of 2014 she's also a judge in the Armenian talent competition The X Factor's 3rd season.

Eurovision Song Contest
In February 2010, Emmy along with singer Mihran participated in the 2010 Armenia pre-selection for the Eurovision Song Contest 2010 with the entry "Hey (Let Me Hear You Say)" which was even endorsed by Ricky Martin. The pair came second losing out to eventual winner, Eva Rivas with "Apricot Stone" for the ticket to the 2010 Contest in Bærum. Bejanyan represented Armenia at Eurovision Song Contest 2011 in Düsseldorf, Germany. On May 10, Emmy failed to qualify for the final, making her the first Armenian Eurovision act to miss the final.

Awards and nominations

References

Living people
21st-century Armenian women singers
Musicians from Yerevan
Eurovision Song Contest entrants of 2011
Eurovision Song Contest entrants for Armenia
1984 births
Armenian pop singers